2011 Kurdish protests may refer to demonstrations by the Kurdish minority in a number of countries, concurrent with and inspired by the Arab Spring in early 2011:

 2011 Kurdish protests in Iraq, which took place in northern Iraq against the Kurdish Regional Government.
 2011–2012 Kurdish protests in Turkey, which have seen Kurds in Turkey clash with the government over perceived discrimination and demands for regional autonomy.
 2011 Syrian uprising, which has involved Kurds in Syria demonstrating for greater cultural rights and civil liberties.
 2011 Iranian protests, which witnessed demonstrations against the government by Kurds in Iran, especially in traditionally Kurdish regions.